Teskeyellus is a genus of horse flies in the family Tabanidae.

Species
Teskeyellus cyanommatus Henroques & Carmo, 2017
Teskeyellus hirsuticornis Philip & Fairchild, 1974

References

Tabanidae
Brachycera genera
Diptera of South America
Diptera of North America
Taxa named by Cornelius Becker Philip